East Galena Township is one of twenty-three townships in Jo Daviess County, Illinois, USA.  As of the 2010 census, its population was 1,283 and it contained 917 housing units.

Geography

Cities, towns, villages
 Galena.

Cemeteries
The township contains these two cemeteries: Miners Chapel and Saint Michaels.

Major highways
  U.S. Route 20.
  Illinois Route 84.

Airports and landing strips
 Heller Airport.

Landmarks
 The Galena Territory.

Demographics

School districts
 Galena Unit School District 120.
 Scales Mound Community Unit School District 211.

Political districts
 Illinois' 16th congressional district.
 State House District 89.
 State Senate District 45.

References
 
 United States Census Bureau 2007 TIGER/Line Shapefiles.
 United States National Atlas.

External links
 Jo Daviess County official site.
 City-Data.com.
 Illinois State Archives.
 Township Officials of Illinois.

Townships in Jo Daviess County, Illinois
Townships in Illinois